Aghvan Chatinyan (born 20 November 1927 in Vardablur, Stepanavan, Armenia) is an Armenian mountaineer and several times Caucasus rock climbing champion.

At the 1952 Caucasus Championship of rock climbing in Arzni, he defeated Soviet climber Mikhael Khergiani and took the first place, but this fact is noted only in the October issue of the newspaper Kommunist (October 30, 1952) and nowhere else not to overshadow the legendary Khergiani. Chatinyan graduated from Kirovakan Agricultural College in 1945 and Armenian State Institute of Physical Culture in 1952. He has been working there as a professor since 1999. He is an honorable member of the Armenian Olympic Committee.

References

External links
Up The Rocks - Aghvan Chatinyan profile 

1927 births
Living people
Armenian State Institute of Physical Culture and Sport alumni
Armenian mountain climbers
People from Stepanavan